Southern Cross All-Stars is an American Football (Gridiron) Team that assembles once a year to visit Oahu, Hawaii to compete against a Hawaiian All-Star team. The 2012 Southern Cross All-Stars traveled to Hawaii in November 2012 where they practiced for 1 week and competed in a game against Hawaii at the end of the tour.

The name "Southern Cross" comes from the "Crux" constellation which is found on the Australian and New Zealand Flags.

Players

2012 

In 2012, the Southern Cross All-Stars were made up of players representing clubs all across Australia and New Zealand. There were 45 players in total that ranged from 18–46 years of age.

2013 & Beyond 

This year, the Southern Cross All-Stars will field a Men's and Women's tackle American Football (Gridiron) team which will be in Oahu, Hawaii from November 24, 2013 to December 2, 2013.

Director 
The Director of the Southern Cross All-Stars is Paul Manera, a native of Sydney, Australia who played for the University of Hawaii Rainbow Warriors from 1989 to 1991 as an Offensive lineman. He is now the director of Bring It On Sports, an organization that specializes in recruiting services and sports travel for American Football players as well as athletes in other sports.

References

American football teams in Australia
American football teams in New Zealand
1996 establishments in Oceania
American football teams established in 1996